GJ 1245 (Gliese 1245) is a double star with components G 208-44 and G 208-45, 14 light-years away, relatively close to the Solar System.  G 208-44 is itself a closer double star made up of two red dwarfs, while G 208-45 is also a red dwarf.  GJ 1245 is the 37th closest stellar system to the Solar System, located in the constellation Cygnus.  GJ 1245 A and B are active flare stars, and the pair are collectively designated V1581 Cygni.

The largest of the three stars, G208-44 A (GJ 1245 A) is only 11% the Sun's mass.  Of the other two stars, G 208-44 B (GJ 1245 C), is closest to star A at 8 AU away; it is 7% of the Sun's Mass.  The third star, GJ 1245 B, is 33 AU away from star A, and is 10% of the Sun's Mass; it would appear as bright as Venus does from Earth when viewed from star A.

See also
 List of nearest stars

References

Further reading

 Table with parallaxes.

External links
 http://jumk.de/astronomie/near-stars/v1581-cygni.shtml
 http://www.answers.com/topic/list-of-nearest-stars?cat=travel
 http://www.richweb.f9.co.uk/astro/nearby_stars.htm

Local Bubble
Triple star systems
Cygnus (constellation)
1245
Cygni, V1581
M-type main-sequence stars
Ursa Major Moving Group